The 1971 South Pacific Games, held at Papeete in Tahiti from 25 August to 5 September 1971, was the fourth edition of the South Pacific Games.

Approximately 1,500 male athletes and 500 female athletes participated in the games.

Participating countries
Fourteen Pacific nations or territories competed at the Games:

Note: A number in parentheses indicates the size of a country's team (where known).

Sports
There were 17 sports contested at the 1971 South Pacific Games:

Note: A number in parentheses indicates how many medal events were contested in that sport (where known).

Final medal table
Medals were awarded in 117 events:

Notes
 Cycling: Six events were held: 1 km time trial, individual road race (111 km), 74 km road race, 4 km individual pursuit, 4 km Olympic pursuit, and an individual sprint.

 The sailing event was for the  Fireball dinghy class.

The women's softball tournament was won by Guam, with Papua New Guinea and American Samoa taking second and third place respectively, although the Oceania Sport Information Centre report (on their Sporting Pulse webpage as at October 2015) omits the result.

References

Sources

Pacific Games by year
Pacific Games
Pacific Games
 
1971 in French Polynesia
International sports competitions hosted by Tahiti
South Pacific Games
South Pacific Games